Pasambahan dance is a Minangkabau traditional dance that has developed in various regions in the province of West Sumatra, Indonesia. Pasambahan dance is usually performed as a ceremonial welcoming dance to honor the guests and elders to a traditional ceremony. However, in nowadays, this dance is performed not only in ceremonial welcoming events, but also as performance art at public.

Pasambahan dance is performed in some cases—that are when the guests come from afar or when the groom arrives at the bride's house.

Gallery

See also

 Dance in Indonesia
 Indang
 Lilin
 Piring
 Zapin

References

Minangkabau dance